Julius Roden is a Filipino producer and director known for his roles in creating internet movies.

VisMinwood Entertainment
Hailed as "The Father of Modern Cebuano Movies" due to the success of Puppy Love; a youth-oriented Cebuano Visayan web series, which aired on CCTN Channel 47 in 2016. Julius Roden opened VisMinwood Entertainment via World Cybervision Network in 2018.

Early career
The first contribution of Julius Roden in the world of independent cinema was the old school horror movie Kasambahay (The Dead's Grin), - released in 2008 at the U.P. Film Institute.

A tribute to old school Pinoy horror films that successfully established a remix of scary movies in the past decades of 1970s and 1980s, cascading unrelated scenarios, poor lighting and automatic dialogue replacement, cheap camera angles, and scratches; to make it look like an old film. But critics thought had Roden used 35mm instead of a digital camera, it could've been something else rather than making it look like a second rate copycat of Blairwitch, which failed to have extensive screenings and international distribution.

However, Roden opined it was experimental. Showing a collection of scary scenes patterned from old school Filipino horror movies was the best of its intention. Audience focusing on the characters relation to the story in the movie itself was never recommended by Roden. Just another popcorn horror flick for moviegoers.

Shorts

In 2009, Roden produced a short film titled Daloy - written and directed by Ron Sapinoso. It was the time when he incepted to work with other young filmmakers and underground musicians.

However, the writer and director Ron Sapinoso was no newbie. He is an established artist, animator, digital filmmaker, having written many stories during the twilight of the Philippine comics industry and won several poetry awards. As a matter of fact, Sapinoso's visual arts were exhibited in Germany in 1997, and won the ACPI Animazing Short in 2006 and the 2009 CG Excellence Award in Singapore. With all these factors, the aggressive Julius Roden gave Ron Sapinoso a shot for a collaboration.

Mainstream

In 2010, Julius Roden hit mainstream with the television movie All About Adam (TV series) aired on IBC.

Topbilled by Migui Moreno, Philipp Dunkel, Jeffrey Canlas and Michael Ignacio.

Inspired by the early 1990s hit Filipino sitcom Palibhasa Lalake

The plot is very simple but definitely a fresh approach in its own. Men love sex.

In the movie pilot, it deals with AIDS Awareness and the risk of getting infected with HIV through unprotected sexual intercourse.

The movie pilot of All About Adam is considered a mediocre tryout of converting a Filipino sitcom to a television film drama series, gathering several followers on social networking sites; and yet the supposed airing of its first full season for summer 2011 was cancelled.

It was turned down by other networks due to lack of sponsors and supporters. Roden's vision was to give an alternative drama series to some Filipino audience that grew tired of stereotyped Filipino soap operas.

Filmography

Movies

Television

Free-to-air

Internet TV

Cybervision

Roden embraces internet television. He calls it cybervision from the words cyberspace and television.

See also
 List of programs broadcast by Intercontinental Broadcasting Corporation

References

External links
World CyberVision Network Official Site
WCN Official YouTube Channel

Intercontinental Broadcasting Corporation people
Living people
1982 births